Mont de l'Etoile is a mountain of the Swiss Pennine Alps, located west of Les Haudères in the canton of Valais. On its west side lies a glacier named Glacier de Vouasson.

References

External links
 Mont de l'Etoile on Hikr

Mountains of the Alps
Alpine three-thousanders
Mountains of Valais
Mountains of Switzerland